is Rimi Natsukawa's third original album, released on .

Background

Kaze no Michi was Natsukawa's first original album since 2003's Sora no Keshiki, in between which she released two cover albums. The album was preceded by the single "Kana yo Kana yo," written and produced by Kazufumi Miyazawa of The Boom.

Collaborations

The album, unlike most of her former releases, centres around original songs. Many of these songs are collaborations with famous musicians/songwriters. "Aitakute" was written by members of The Gospellers, "Shiahō: Xie He" was written by Chinese composer Liang Jian Feng (musical director/composer for Twelve Girls Band) and "Hyakuman no Hoshi" had music composed by Korean singer/songwriter Yang Jeong Seung (Kiroy Y).

Track listing

Japan sales rankings

References

Rimi Natsukawa albums
2004 albums
Victor Entertainment albums